Birmingham Trades Council is the trades council body which brings together trade unionists from across Birmingham, England. Its headquarters were formerly in Digbeth, with a huge mural above the canteen area depicting the 1972 Battle of Saltley Gate.

Secretaries

Presidents
1869: Thomas Green
1870:
1871: H. Giles
1874:
1875: C. R. Bowkett
1878: J. Lewis
1880: Allan Grainger
1887: John Valentine Stevens
1889: Alfred Jephcott
1892: C. C. Cooke
1895: Arthur Eades
1898: Henry Simpson
1899: Joseph Millington
1902:
1904: W. J. Morgan
1909:
1910: Joseph Kesterton
1912:
1914: E. E. Edwards
1916: G. Stanway
1917: F. W. Rudland
1919: F. E. Willis
1920: A. Shakespeare
1921: A. P. Cassidy
1922: H. G. Johnson
1924:
1929: H. G. Johnson
1933: 
1937: C. G. Spragg
1939: Walter Samuel Lewis
1942: Ernest Haynes
1951: Bob Shorthouse
1955: George Varnom
1961: W. E. Jarvis

External links 

 Birmingham Trades Council

References

Trade unions established in 1866
Trades Council
Trades councils
Politics of Birmingham, West Midlands